This is a list of discontinued music notation programs.  For non-discontinued products, see List of scorewriters.

Free software 
 Manuscript Writer

Proprietary

Microsoft Windows 
 Winscore, development discontinued since 2013

Mac OS 
 ConcertWare

Other 
 Bank Street Music Writer (Atari 8-bit, Apple II, Commodore 64 and DOS)
 Calliope by William Clocksin, which was the subject of an academic usability study
 Cubase Score V1-2 (Atari ST)
 Deluxe Music Construction Set (Commodore Amiga)
 SCORE (DOS – once a leading publishing program)

See also 
 Comparison of scorewriters
 Comparison of MIDI editors and sequencers
 List of guitar tablature software
 List of music software

References 

Lists of software
Scorewriters